Ascodichaena rugosa is a species of fungus in the family Ascodichaenaceae. It was first scientifically described as a new species by Carl Linnaeus in 1753 as Lichen rugosum. Heinz Butin transferred it to the newly circumscribed genus Ascodichaena in 1977, in which it is the type species.

References

Leotiomycetes
Fungi of Europe
Fungi of North America
Fungi described in 1753
Taxa named by Carl Linnaeus